Walkerville Brewing Company is a brewery in Windsor, Ontario.  The first incarnation operated from 1885 to 1956.  A new company with the same name started up in 1998, but declared bankruptcy in 2007. The company was purchased again and is now a microbrewery located in the City of Windsor.

The brewery has product in many local bars in the area of Windsor and Essex County and the LCBO.

Products:
Honest Lager (Oktoberfest/Märzen Lager) with German hops.
Easy Stout (Milk Stout).
Geronimo IPA (North American IPA) Coarsely filtered India Pale Ale, with grapefruit, orange peel and piney aromas from several kilos of different American hops. 
Purity Pilsener (German Style Pilsener) pale yellow beer with German Hallertau hops.
Road Block Doppelbock (German Style Doppelbock) Long cool fermentation beer with German malts.

References

External links
Walkerville Brewing Company (archived website)
Walkerville Brewery (active website)

Defunct breweries of Canada
Cuisine of Ontario